Labrador is the mainland part of the province of Newfoundland and Labrador, Canada. This name can also refer to:

Geographical regions
 Labrador (electoral district)
 Labrador Peninsula
 Labrador Sea
 Labrador District, a district in the canton of San Mateo in the province of Alajuela

Towns
 Labrador, Queensland, Australia
 Labrador, Pangasinan, Philippines

Areas
 Labrador Hollow Unique Area, New York, USA
 Labrador Nature Reserve, Singapore

Current
 Labrador Current, cold current in the Atlantic ocean

People
 João Fernandes Lavrador (died ca. 1505), a landholder and explorer
 Pedro Gómez Labrador, Marquis of Labrador (1755–1852), diplomat who represented Spain at the Congress of Vienna
 Raúl Labrador, United States politician, member of the US House of Representatives from Idaho

Vehicles
  (formerly HMCS Labrador (AW 50), Canadian icebreaker in service from 1954 to 1987
 CH-113 Labrador, helicopter used by Canadian Forces Air Command
 , operated by the Hudson's Bay Company from 1866–1887, see Hudson's Bay Company vessels

Animals
 Labrador duck, extinct North American bird
 Labrador Retriever, breed of dog

A plant
 Labrador tea, a common name for 3 species of plants

Music-related
 Labrador Records, alternative record label from Stockholm, Sweden